Jan Sangharsh Manch is a voluntary civil rights organisation established in Gujarat, India. It was founded by Mukul Sinha, lawyer and trade union leader, and his wife Nirjhari Sinha, human rights activist, parents of Alt News founder Pratik Sinha. The group represented the 2002 Gujarat violence victims and legally fought the Gujarat state government, in the Shah-Nanavati inquiry. The organisation has also fought for justice to the families of the victims in the fake encounter cases and exposed claims of the police and Modi's government branding them as terrorists to the public. The legal interventions by the organisation led the Supreme Court in the Sohrabuddin Sheikh case to pass the investigation from the Gujarat police to the Central Bureau of Investigation. This set a precedent as all the other cases taken up by JSM were handed over to the CBI and the investigation in all these cases established them as extrajudicial killings.

References

Civil rights organizations